Vismianthus is a genus of flowering plants belonging to the family Connaraceae.

Its native range is Tanzania, Myanmar.

Species:
 Vismianthus punctatus Mildbr. 
 Vismianthus sterculiifolius (Prain) Breteler & J.Brouwer

References

Connaraceae
Oxalidales genera